Cheng Kun may refer to the following people:

Cheng Kun (成昆), a fictional character in the novel The Heaven Sword and Dragon Saber
Cheng Kun (成坤), a fictional character in the novel Baifa Monü Zhuan